Nokon is a village on the south-eastern coast of New Ireland, Papua New Guinea. According to Alexander H. Bolyanatz, "Tekedan, Himaul, and Nokon form something of a sociological cluster." It contains a United Church. It is located in Namatanai Rural LLG.

References

Populated places in New Ireland Province